Odio may refer to:

 Elizabeth Odio Benito (born 1939), Vice-President of the International Criminal Court
 Rodrigo Carazo Odio (1926–2009), President of Costa Rica
 Odio, the primary antagonist of the video game Live A Live

Music
 Odio, band in the Basque Radical Rock movement

Songs
 "Odio", Umberto Bindi 1959 
 "Odio",  prize winning song by Pablo Ríos 1970
 "Odio" (song), song by Romeo Santos 2014

See also

 Odo (disambiguation)